Ponticulus may refer to:

 Ponticulus, anatomy
 Lasiopogon ponticulus, plant
 Arcuate foramen, anatomic variant